The Garside Classification Scheme is a library classification system used in most of the libraries of University College London (UCL).  It was devised by Kenneth Garside while he was deputy librarian there.  Intellectually, it was based on the close relationship between the library and the teaching departments.  The library at UCL rejected the major published classification schemes because "none of them would generally acceptable to the teaching departments without such major modifications as would have destroyed its essential character." Instead, it was modeled around the "subject reading rooms" into which the collection had been divided.  The intent was to utilise the expertise of the departments, and their teaching needs in drawing up the divisions within the scheme.

Main outline
The principles of the scheme were "To provide the optimum arrangement of books in each subject; to permit the revision of the classification to meet a changing academic approach to a subject without disturbing in any way other parts of the scheme; and to provide as simple a shelf mark as possible to help the reader find the book he wants with the minimum mental effort."

In his article The basic principles of the new library classification at University College London Garside set out the generic structure of the system.  The library would be divided into subject-based reading rooms such as, in the example nelow, a dedicated space for biology-related materials. These would then be subdivided according to the below table, using alphabetical characters:

The alphabetical sub-divisions were designed in consultation with the teaching department. These subsections would then be divided by numbers:

The completed shelf mark would then include the first three letters of the author's surname.

Example

E.g. Basic Concepts in Population, Quantitative, and Evolutionary Genetics by James F. Crow is shelved at BIOLOGY H 5 CRO.

Subject sequence
In order to provide for a single subject card catalogue, Garside added a further table to which the top reading room divisions could be mapped.

Use
The scheme is used at UCL.  An adapted version is used by the Folklore Society.  Garside instituted a similar scheme in his time at Leeds University.

References

Controlled vocabularies
Library cataloging and classification